Thomas Beverley Evans Jr. (born November 5, 1931) is an American lawyer and politician from Delaware. He is a member of the Republican Party, who served three terms as U.S. Representative from Delaware.

Early life and family
Evans was born in Nashville, Tennessee, attended the public schools of Old Hickory, Tennessee and Seaford, Delaware, and graduated from Woodberry Forest School in Orange, Virginia in 1947. He then graduated from the University of Virginia in 1953, where he was a member of St. Elmo Hall and the University of Virginia Law School in 1956.

Professional career
Evans was admitted to the Virginia Bar in 1956, then engaged in the insurance and mortgage brokerage business in Wilmington, Delaware from 1957 until 1968. He served in the Delaware National Guard from 1956 until 1960, as clerk to the Chief Justice of Delaware Supreme Court in 1955, as director of the Delaware State Development Department from 1969 until 1970, and co-chairman and chief operating officer of the Republican National Committee from 1971 until 1973.

He was a member of law firm of Manatt, Phelps & Phillips in Washington, D.C.  He also served as Chairman of the Florida Coalition for Preservation, a not-for-profit organization formed in April 2007 to promote responsible growth and protect coastal barrier islands through the education of the public and other concerned groups. Currently, Evans is a member of the ReFormers Caucus of Issue One.

United States Representative
Evans was elected to the U.S. House of Representatives in 1976, defeating Democrat Samuel L. Shipley. He won election three times in all, also defeating Democrats Gary E. Hindes in 1978 and Robert L. Maxwell in 1980. During these three terms, he served in the Republican minority in the 95th, 96th and 97th Congress. He came to the U.S. Congress already a friend of U.S. Senator Bob Dole, and later became a friend of United States President Ronald Reagan. He served on the U.S. House Committee on Banking, Finance and Urban Affairs and the U.S House Committee on Merchant Marine and Fisheries. Passionate about the environment, Evans co-authored the Coastal Barrier Resources Act and the Alaska Wilderness Preservation Act.  He also co authored the Evans-Tsongas Act. In 2016, the National Wildlife Federation gave Evans a Conservation Leadership Award  for these achievements.

Evans was involved in a scandal involving lobbyist and former nude model Paula Parkinson, in which allegations were made that she traded sex for political influence. The US Department of Justice investigated the allegations and found no evidence of any crimes.  Evans was defeated in his attempt at a fourth term in 1982. In all, Evans served from January 3, 1977 until January 3, 1983, during the administrations of U.S. Presidents Jimmy Carter and Ronald Reagan.

Almanac
Elections are held the first Tuesday after November 1. U.S. Representatives take office January 3 and have a two-year term.

See also
List of federal political sex scandals in the United States

References

External links
Biographical Directory of the United States Congress 
Delaware's Members of Congress 
The Political Graveyard
Florida Coalition for Preservation
The Volatile Mix of Politics and Golf
Delaware Historical Society; website 
University of Delaware; Library website
 

1931 births
Living people
Politicians from Nashville, Tennessee
Delaware lawyers
People from Wilmington, Delaware
University of Virginia alumni
University of Virginia School of Law alumni
Republican Party members of the United States House of Representatives from Delaware
Woodberry Forest School alumni
Delaware National Guard personnel
Members of Congress who became lobbyists